James Ewing Hospital was a 300-bed Manhattan hospital notable for helping cancer patients. Memorial Sloan Kettering took over running James Ewing Hospital in 1968.

History
 
Ewing'''s predecessor was "City Cancer Hospital on Welfare Island;" the First Avenue location opened in 1950.

The Ewing building was a "ten-story structure on First Avenue, between Sixty-seventh and Sixty-eighth Streets" and  James Ewing Hospital was "an affiliate of Memorial Center for Cancer and Allied Diseases." an earlier name of Memorial Sloan Kettering.

The hospital was named after Dr. James Ewing (1866-1943), who had pioneered in cancer research and was featured on the cover of a 1931 Time Magazine issue as "Cancer Man Ewing." The hospital building, 1250 First Avenue in Manhattan, today is Memorial Sloan Ketterings's Arnold and Marie Schwartz Cancer Research Building.''

References

Hospital buildings completed in 1950
Hospitals in Manhattan